Žernov is a municipality and village in Semily District in the Liberec Region of the Czech Republic. It has about 200 inhabitants.

Administrative parts
Villages of Křečovice 1.díl, Podtýn, Proseč and Sýkořice are administrative parts of Žernov.

References

Villages in Semily District